Schwalbe's line is the anatomical line found on the interior surface of the eye's cornea, and delineates the outer limit of the corneal endothelium layer. Specifically, it represents the termination of Descemet's membrane.  In many cases it can be seen via gonioscopy.

Some evidence suggests that the corneal endothelium actually possesses stem cells that can produce endothelial cells, especially after injury, albeit on a limited scale.

References

Human eye anatomy